Kovaški Vrh is a dispersed settlement in the Municipality of Oplotnica in eastern Slovenia. It lies in the hills northwest of Oplotnica. The area is part of the traditional region of Styria and is now included in the Drava Statistical Region.

References

External links
Kovaški Vrh on Geopedia

Populated places in the Municipality of Oplotnica